The Man Who Disappeared is a 1914 American drama film serial directed by Charles Brabin. The film is considered lost.

Cast
 Marc McDermott - John Perriton
 Herbert Yost - Nelson Wales (as Barry O'Moore)
 Miriam Nesbitt - Mary Wales
 Marjorie Ellison - Jennie
 Cora Williams
 Harry Eytinge - Lawyer Lipman
 Charles Ogle - Miens
 T. Tamamoto - Den Keeper
 Harry Mason
 Harry Linson
 Joseph Manning
 Floyd France
 George D. Melville
 Warren Cook

See also
 List of film serials
 List of film serials by studio

References

External links

1914 films
1914 drama films
American thriller films
American silent serial films
American black-and-white films
Films directed by Charles Brabin
Films shot in New Jersey
Lost American films
American drama films
Edison Manufacturing Company films
1914 lost films
Silent American drama films
1910s American films
Silent thriller films